Stenoptilia tyropiesta is a moth of the family Pterophoridae. It is known from Ethiopia.

References

Endemic fauna of Ethiopia
tyropiesta
Insects of Ethiopia
Moths of Africa
Moths described in 1932